A suffragette was a member of an activist women's organisation in the early 20th century who, under the banner "Votes for Women", fought for the right to vote in public elections in the United Kingdom. The term refers in particular to members of the British Women's Social and Political Union (WSPU), a women-only movement founded in 1903 by Emmeline Pankhurst, which engaged in direct action and civil disobedience. In 1906, a reporter writing in the Daily Mail coined the term suffragette for the WSPU, derived from suffragist (any person advocating for voting rights), in order to belittle the women advocating women's suffrage. The militants embraced the new name, even adopting it for use as the title of the newspaper published by the WSPU. 

Women had won the right to vote in several countries by the end of the 19th century; in 1893, New Zealand became the first self-governing country to grant the vote to all women over the age of 21. When by 1903 women in Britain had not been enfranchised, Pankhurst decided that women had to "do the work ourselves"; the WSPU motto became "deeds, not words". The suffragettes heckled politicians, tried to storm parliament, were attacked and sexually assaulted during battles with the police, chained themselves to railings, smashed windows, carried out a nationwide bombing and arson campaign, and faced anger and ridicule in the media. When imprisoned they went on hunger strike, not eating for days or even a week, to which the government responded by force-feeding them. The first suffragette to be force fed was Evaline Hilda Burkitt. The death of one suffragette, Emily Davison, when she ran in front of the king's horse at the 1913 Epsom Derby, made headlines around the world. The WSPU campaign had varying levels of support from within the suffragette movement; breakaway groups formed, and within the WSPU itself not all members supported the direct action.

The suffragette campaign was suspended when World War I broke out in 1914. After the war, the Representation of the People Act 1918 gave the vote to women over the age of 30 who met certain property qualifications. Ten years later, women gained electoral equality with men when the Representation of the People (Equal Franchise) Act 1928 gave all women the right to vote at age 21.

Background

Women's suffrage
Although the Isle of Man (a British Crown dependency) had enfranchised women who owned property to vote in parliamentary (Tynwald) elections in 1881, New Zealand was the first self-governing country to grant all women the right to vote in 1893, when women over the age of 21 were permitted to vote in all parliamentary elections. Women in South Australia achieved the same right and became the first to obtain the right to stand for parliament in 1895. In the United States, white women over the age of 21 were allowed to vote in the western territories of Wyoming from 1869 and in Utah from 1870.

British suffragettes
In 1865 John Stuart Mill was elected to Parliament on a platform that included votes for women, and in 1869 he published his essay in favour of equality of the sexes The Subjection of Women. Also in 1865, a women's discussion group, The Kensington Society, was formed. Following discussions on the subject of women's suffrage, the society formed a committee to draft a petition and gather signatures, which Mill agreed to present to Parliament once they had gathered 100 signatures. In October 1866, amateur scientist Lydia Becker attended a meeting of the National Association for the Promotion of Social Science held in Manchester and heard one of the organisors of the petition, Barbara Bodichon, read a paper entitled Reasons for the Enfranchisement of Women. Becker was inspired to help gather signatures around Manchester and to join the newly formed Manchester committee. Mill presented the petition to Parliament in 1866, by which time the supporters had gathered 1499 signatures, including those of Florence Nightingale, Harriet Martineau, Josephine Butler and Mary Somerville.

In March 1867, Becker wrote an article for the Contemporary Review, in which she said:

Two further petitions were presented to parliament in May 1867 and Mill also proposed an amendment to the 1867 Reform Act to give women the same political rights as men, but the amendment was treated with derision and defeated by 196 votes to 73.

The Manchester Society for Women's suffrage was formed in January 1867, when Jacob Bright, Rev. S. A. Steinthal, Mrs. Gloyne, Max Kyllman and Elizabeth Wolstenholme met at the house of Dr. Louis Borchardt. Lydia Becker was made Secretary of the Society in February 1867 and Dr. Richard Pankhurst was one of the earliest members of the Executive Committee. An 1874 speaking event in Manchester organised by Becker, was attended by 14-year-old Emmeline Goulden, who was to become an ardent campaigner for women's rights, and later married Dr Pankhurst becoming known as Emmeline Pankhurst.

During the summer of 1880, Becker visited the Isle of Man to address five public meetings on the subject of women's suffrage to audiences mainly composed of women. These speeches instilled in the Manx women a determination to secure the franchise, and on 31 January 1881, women on the island who owned property in their own right were given the vote.

Formation of the WSPU

In Manchester, the Women's Suffrage Committee had been formed in 1867 to work with the Independent Labour Party (ILP) to secure votes for women, but, although the local ILP were very supportive, nationally the party were more interested in securing the franchise for working-class men and refused to make women's suffrage a priority. In 1897, the Manchester Women's Suffrage committee had merged with the National Union of Women's Suffrage Societies (NUWSS) but Emmeline Pankhurst, who was a member of the original Manchester committee, and her eldest daughter Christabel had become impatient with the ILP, and on 10 October 1903, Emmeline Pankhurst held a meeting at her home in Manchester to form a breakaway group, the Women's Social and Political Union (WSPU). From the outset, the WSPU was determined to move away from the staid campaign methods of NUWSS and instead take more positive action:

The term "suffragette" was first used in 1906 as a term of derision by the journalist Charles E. Hands in the London Daily Mail to describe activists in the movement for women's suffrage, in particular members of the WSPU. But the women he intended to ridicule embraced the term, saying "suffraGETtes" (hardening the 'g'), implying not only that they wanted the vote, but that they intended to 'get' it. The non-militant suffragists found favour in the press, as they were not hoping to get the franchise through 'violence, crime, arson and open rebellion'.

WSPU campaigns

At a political meeting in Manchester in 1905, Christabel Pankhurst and millworker, Annie Kenney, disrupted speeches by prominent Liberals Winston Churchill and Sir Edward Grey, asking where Churchill and Grey stood with regards to women's political rights. At a time when political meetings were only attended by men and speakers were expected to be given the courtesy of expounding their views without interruption, the audience were outraged, and when the women unfurled a "Votes for Women" banner they were both arrested for a technical assault on a policeman. When Pankhurst and Kenney appeared in court they both refused to pay the fine imposed, preferring to go to prison to gain publicity for their cause.

In July 1908 the WSPU hosted a large demonstration in Heaton Park, near Manchester with speakers on 13 separate platforms including Emmeline, Christabel and Adela Pankhurst. According to the Manchester Guardian:

Stung by the stereotypical image of the strong minded woman in masculine clothes created by newspaper cartoonists, the suffragettes resolved to present a fashionable, feminine image when appearing in public. In 1908 the co-editor of the WSPU's Votes for Women newspaper, Emmeline Pethick-Lawrence, designed the suffragettes' colour scheme of purple for loyalty and dignity, white for purity, and green for hope. Fashionable London shops Selfridges and Liberty sold tricolour-striped ribbon for hats, rosettes, badges and belts, as well as coloured garments, underwear, handbags, shoes, slippers and toilet soap. As membership of the WSPU grew it became fashionable for women to identify with the cause by wearing the colours, often discreetly in a small piece of jewellery or by carrying a heart-shaped vesta case and in December 1908 the London jewellers, Mappin & Webb, issued a catalogue of suffragette jewellery in time for the Christmas season. Sylvia Pankhurst said at the time: "Many suffragists spend more money on clothes than they can comfortably afford, rather than run the risk of being considered outré, and doing harm to the cause". In 1909 the WSPU presented specially commissioned pieces of jewellery to leading suffragettes, Emmeline Pankhurst and Louise Eates.

The suffragettes also used other methods to publicise and raise money for the cause and from 1909, the "Pank-a-Squith" board game was sold by the WSPU. The name was derived from Pankhurst and the surname of Prime Minister H. H. Asquith, who was largely hated by the movement. The board game was set out in a spiral, and players were required to lead their suffragette figure from their home to parliament, past the obstacles faced from Prime Minister H. H. Asquith and the Liberal government. Also in 1909, suffragettes Daisy Solomon and Elspeth McClelland tried an innovative method of potentially obtaining a meeting with Asquith by sending themselves by Royal Mail courier post; however, Downing Street did not accept the parcel.

1912 was a turning point for the suffragettes, as they turned to using more militant tactics and began a window-smashing campaign. Some members of the WSPU, including Emmeline Pethick-Lawrence and her husband Frederick, disagreed with this strategy but Christabel Pankhurst ignored their objections. In response to this, the Government ordered the arrest of the WSPU leaders and, although Christabel Pankhurst escaped to France, the Pethick-Lawrences were arrested, tried and sentenced to nine months' imprisonment. On their release, the Pethick-Lawrences began to speak out publicly against the window-smashing campaign, arguing that it would lose support for the cause, and eventually they were expelled from the WSPU. Having lost control of Votes for Women the WSPU began to publish their own newspaper under the title The Suffragette.

The campaign was then escalated, with the suffragettes chaining themselves to railings, setting fire to post box contents, smashing windows and eventually detonating bombs, as part of a wider bombing campaign. Some radical techniques used by the suffragettes were learned from Russian exiles from tsarism who had escaped to England. In 1914, at least seven churches were bombed or set on fire across the United Kingdom, including Westminster Abbey, where an explosion aimed at destroying the 700-year-old Coronation Chair, only caused minor damage. Places that wealthy people, typically men, frequented were also burnt and destroyed whilst left unattended so that there was little risk to life, including cricket pavilions, horse-racing pavilions, churches, castles and the second homes of the wealthy. They also burnt the slogan "Votes for Women" into the grass of golf courses. Pinfold Manor in Surrey, which was being built for the Chancellor of the Exchequer, David Lloyd George, was targeted with two bombs on 19 February 1913, only one of which exploded, causing significant damage; in her memoirs, Sylvia Pankhurst said that Emily Davison had carried out the attack. There were 250 arson or destruction attacks in a six-month period in 1913 and in April the newspapers reported "What might have been the most serious outrage yet perpetrated by the Suffragettes":

There are reports in the Parliamentary Papers which include lists of the 'incendiary devices', explosions, artwork destruction (including an axe attack upon a painting of The Duke of Wellington in the National Gallery), arson attacks, window-breaking, postbox burning and telegraph cable cutting, that took place during the most militant years, from 1910 to 1914. Both suffragettes and police spoke of a "Reign of Terror"; newspaper headlines referred to "Suffragette Terrorism".

One suffragette, Emily Davison, died under the King's horse, Anmer, at The Derby on 4 June 1913. It is debated whether she was trying to pull down the horse, attach a suffragette scarf or banner to it, or commit suicide to become a martyr to the cause. However, recent analysis of the film of the event suggests that she was merely trying to attach a scarf to the horse, and the suicide theory seems unlikely as she was carrying a return train ticket from Epsom and had holiday plans with her sister in the near future.

Imprisonment
In the early 20th century until the outbreak of World War I, approximately one thousand suffragettes were imprisoned in Britain. Most early incarcerations were for public order offences and failure to pay outstanding fines. While incarcerated, suffragettes lobbied to be considered political prisoners; with such a designation, suffragettes would be placed in the First Division as opposed to the Second or Third Division of the prison system, and as political prisoners would be granted certain freedoms and liberties not allotted to other prison divisions, such as being allowed frequent visits and being allowed to write books or articles. Because of a lack of consistency between the different courts, suffragettes would not necessarily be placed in the First Division and could be placed in the Second or Third Division, which enjoyed fewer liberties.

This cause was taken up by the Women's Social and Political Union (WSPU), a large organisation in Britain, that lobbied for women's suffrage led by militant suffragette Emmeline Pankhurst. The WSPU campaigned to get imprisoned suffragettes recognised as political prisoners. However, this campaign was largely unsuccessful. Citing a fear that the suffragettes becoming political prisoners would make for easy martyrdom, and with thoughts from the courts and the Home Office that they were abusing the freedoms of the First Division to further the agenda of the WSPU, suffragettes were placed in the Second Division, and in some cases the Third Division, in prisons, with no special privileges granted to them as a result.

Hunger strikes and force-feeding

Suffragettes were not recognised as political prisoners, and many of them staged hunger strikes while they were imprisoned. The first woman to refuse food was Marion Wallace Dunlop, a militant suffragette who was sentenced to a month in Holloway for vandalism in July 1909. Without consulting suffragette leaders such as Pankhurst, Dunlop refused food in protest at being denied political prisoner status. After a 92-hour hunger strike, and for fear of her becoming a martyr, the Home Secretary Herbert Gladstone decided to release her early on medical grounds. Dunlop's strategy was adopted by other suffragettes who were incarcerated. It became common practice for suffragettes to refuse food in protest for not being designated as political prisoners, and as a result they would be released after a few days and could return to the "fighting line".

After a public backlash regarding the prison status of suffragettes, the rules of the divisions were amended. In March 1910, Rule 243A was introduced by the Home Secretary Winston Churchill, allowing prisoners in the Second and Third Divisions to be allowed certain privileges of the First Division, provided they were not convicted of a serious offence, effectively ending hunger strikes for two years. Hunger strikes began again when Pankhurst was transferred from the Second Division to the First Division, inciting the other suffragettes to demonstrate regarding their prison status.

Militant suffragette demonstrations subsequently became more aggressive, and the British Government took action. Unwilling to release all the suffragettes refusing food in prison, in the autumn of 1909, the authorities began to adopt more drastic measures to manage the hunger-strikers. In September 1909, the Home Office became unwilling to release hunger-striking suffragettes before their sentence was served. Suffragettes became a liability because, if they were to die in custody, the prison would be responsible for their death. Prisons began the practice of force-feeding the hunger strikers through a tube, most commonly via a nostril or stomach tube or a stomach pump. Force-feeding had previously been practised in Britain but its use had been exclusively for patients in hospitals who were too unwell to eat or swallow food. Despite the practice being deemed safe by medical practitioners for sick patients, it posed health issues for the healthy suffragettes.

The process of tube-feeding was strenuous without the consent of the hunger strikers, who were typically strapped down and force-fed via stomach or nostril tube, often with a considerable amount of force. The process was painful, and after the practice was observed and studied by several physicians, it was deemed to cause both short-term damage to the circulatory system, digestive system and nervous system and long-term damage to the physical and mental health of the suffragettes. The first suffragette to be forcibly-fed was Evaline Hilda Burkitt, who, between 1909 and 1914 was force-fed 292 times. Mary Richardson was recognized as the second suffragette to be force fed while imprisoned, describing her experience as "torture" and an "immoral assault." Some suffragettes who were force-fed developed pleurisy or pneumonia as a result of a misplaced tube. Women who had gone on hunger strike in prison received a Hunger Strike Medal from the WSPU on their release.

Legislation

In April 1913, Reginald McKenna of the Home Office passed the Prisoners (Temporary Discharge for Ill Health) Act 1913, or the Cat and Mouse Act as it was commonly known. The act made the hunger strikes legal, in that a suffragette would be temporarily released from prison when their health began to diminish, only to be readmitted when she regained her health to finish her sentence. The act enabled the British Government to be absolved of any blame resulting from death or harm due to the self-starvation of the striker and ensured that the suffragettes would be too ill and too weak to participate in demonstrative activities while not in custody. Most women continued hunger striking when they were readmitted to prison following their leave. After the Act was introduced, force-feeding on a large scale was stopped and only women convicted of more serious crimes and considered likely to repeat their offences if released were force-fed.

The Bodyguard
In early 1913 and in response to the Cat and Mouse Act, the WSPU instituted a secret society of women known as the "Bodyguard" whose role was to physically protect Emmeline Pankhurst and other prominent suffragettes from arrest and assault. Known members included Katherine Willoughby Marshall, Leonora Cohen and Gertrude Harding; Edith Margaret Garrud was their jujitsu trainer.

The origin of the "Bodyguard" can be traced to a WSPU meeting at which Garrud spoke. As suffragettes speaking in public increasingly found themselves the target of violence and attempted assaults, learning jujitsu was a way for women to defend themselves against angry hecklers. Inciting incidents included Black Friday, during which a deputation of 300 suffragettes were physically prevented by police from entering the House of Commons, sparking a near-riot and allegations of both common and sexual assault.

Members of the "Bodyguard" orchestrated the "escapes" of a number of fugitive suffragettes from police surveillance during 1913 and early 1914. They also participated in several violent actions against the police in defence of their leaders, notably including the "Battle of Glasgow" on 9 March 1914, when a group of about 30 Bodyguards brawled with about 50 police constables and detectives on the stage of St Andrew's Hall in Glasgow. The fight was witnessed by an audience of some 4500 people.

World War I
At the commencement of World War I, the suffragette movement in Britain moved away from suffrage activities and focused on the war effort, and as a result, hunger strikes largely stopped. In August 1914, the British Government released all prisoners who had been incarcerated for suffrage activities on an amnesty, with Pankhurst ending all militant suffrage activities soon after. The suffragettes' focus on war work turned public opinion in favour of their eventual partial enfranchisement in 1918.

Women eagerly volunteered to take on many traditional male roles – leading to a new view of what women were capable of. The war also caused a split in the British suffragette movement; the mainstream, represented by Emmeline and Christabel Pankhurst's WSPU calling a ceasefire in their campaign for the duration of the war, while more radical suffragettes, represented by Sylvia Pankhurst's Women's Suffrage Federation continued the struggle.

Prominent British-Indian suffragette Sophia Duleep Singh, the third daughter of the exiled Sikh Maharajah Duleep Singh, campaigned for support for the British Indian Army and lascars working in the Merchant Navy. She also joined a 10,000-woman protest march against the prohibition of a volunteer female force. Singh volunteered as a British Red Cross Voluntary Aid Detachment nurse, serving at an auxiliary military hospital in Isleworth from October 1915 to January 1917.

The National Union of Women's Suffrage Societies, which had always employed "constitutional" methods, continued to lobby during the war years and compromises were worked out between the NUWSS and the coalition government. On 6 February, the Representation of the People Act 1918 was passed, enfranchising all men over 21 years of age and women over the age of 30 who met minimum property qualifications, gaining the right to vote for about 8.4 million women. In November 1918, the Parliament (Qualification of Women) Act 1918 was passed, allowing women to be elected into parliament. The Representation of the People Act 1928 extended the voting franchise to all women over the age of 21, granting women the vote on the same terms that men had gained ten years earlier.

1918 general election, women members of parliament
The 1918 general election, the first general election to be held after the Representation of the People Act 1918, was the first in which some women (property owners older than 30) could vote. At that election, the first woman to be elected an MP was Constance Markievicz but, in line with Sinn Féin abstentionist policy, she declined to take her seat in the British House of Commons. The first woman to do so was Nancy Astor, Viscountess Astor, following a by-election in November 1919.

Legacy

In the autumn of 1913, Emmeline Pankhurst had sailed to the US to embark on a lecture tour to publicise the message of the WSPU and to raise money for the treatment of her son, Harry, who was gravely ill. By this time the suffragettes' tactics of civil disorder were being used by American militants Alice Paul and Lucy Burns, both of whom had campaigned with the WSPU in London. As in the UK, the suffrage movement in America was divided into two disparate groups, with the National American Woman Suffrage Association representing the more militant campaign and the International Women's Suffrage Alliance taking a more cautious and pragmatic approach Although the publicity surrounding Pankhurst's visit and the militant tactics used by her followers gave a welcome boost to the campaign, the majority of women in the US preferred the more respected label of "suffragist" to the title "suffragette" adopted by the militants.

Many suffragists at the time, and some historians since, have argued that the actions of the militant suffragettes damaged their cause. Opponents at the time saw evidence that women were too emotional and could not think as logically as men. Historians generally argue that the first stage of the militant suffragette movement under the Pankhursts in 1906 had a dramatic mobilising effect on the suffrage movement. Women were thrilled and supportive of an actual revolt in the streets. The membership of the militant WSPU and the older NUWSS overlapped and were mutually supportive. However, a system of publicity, Ensor argues, had to continue to escalate to maintain its high visibility in the media. The hunger strikes and force-feeding did that, but the Pankhursts refused any advice and escalated their tactics. They turned to systematic disruption of Liberal Party meetings as well as physical violence in terms of damaging public buildings and arson. Searle says the methods of the suffragettes harmed the Liberal Party but failed to advance women's suffrage. When the Pankhursts decided to stop their militancy at the start of the war and enthusiastically support the war effort, the movement split and their leadership role ended. Suffrage came four years later, but the feminist movement in Britain permanently abandoned the militant tactics that had made the suffragettes famous.

After Emmeline Pankhurst's death in 1928, money was raised to commission a statue, and on 6 March 1930 the statue in Victoria Tower Gardens was unveiled. A crowd of radicals, former suffragettes and national dignitaries gathered as former Prime Minister Stanley Baldwin presented the memorial to the public. In his address, Baldwin declared: In 1929 a portrait of Emmeline Pankhurst was added to the National Portrait Gallery's collection. In 1987 her former home at 62 Nelson Street, Manchester, the birthplace of the WSPU, and the adjoining Edwardian villa (no. 60) were opened as the Pankhurst Centre, a women-only space and museum dedicated to the suffragette movement. Christabel Pankhurst was appointed a Dame Commander of the Order of the British Empire in 1936, and after her death in 1958 a permanent memorial was installed next to the statue of her mother. The memorial to Christabel Pankhurst consists of a low stone screen flanking her mother's statue with a bronze medallion plaque depicting her profile at one end of the screen paired with a second plaque depicting the "prison brooch" or "badge" of the WSPU at the other end. The unveiling of this dual memorial was performed on 13 July 1959 by the Lord Chancellor, Lord Kilmuir. The Pankhurst's name and image and those of 58 other women's suffrage supporters are etched on the plinth of the statue of Millicent Fawcett in Parliament Square, London that was unveiled in 2018. 

In 1903, the Australian suffragist Vida Goldstein adopted the WSPU colours for her campaign for the Senate in 1910 but got them slightly wrong since she thought that they were purple, green and lavender. Goldstein had visited England in 1911 at the behest of the WSPU. Her speeches around the country drew huge crowds and her tour was touted as "the biggest thing that has happened in the women movement for sometime in England". The correct colours were used for her campaign for Kooyong in 1913 and also for the flag of the Women's Peace Army, which she established during World War I to oppose conscription. During International Women's Year in 1975 the BBC series about the suffragettes, Shoulder to Shoulder, was screened across Australia and Elizabeth Reid, Women's Adviser to Prime Minister Gough Whitlam directed that the WSPU colours be used for the International Women's Year symbol. They were also used for a first-day cover and postage stamp released by Australia Post in March 1975. The colours have since been adopted by government bodies such as the National Women's Advisory Council and organisations such as Women's Electoral Lobby and other women's services such as domestic violence refuges and are much in evidence each year on International Women's day.

The colours of green and heliotrope (purple) were commissioned into a new coat of arms for Edge Hill University in Lancashire in 2006, symbolising the university's early commitment to the equality of women through its beginnings as a women-only college.

During the 1960s, the memory of the suffragettes was kept alive in the public consciousness by portrayals in film, such as the character Mrs Winifred Banks in the 1964 Disney musical film Mary Poppins who sings the song 
"Sister Suffragette" and Maggie DuBois in the 1965 film The Great Race. In 1974 The BBC TV series Shoulder to Shoulder portraying events in the British militant suffrage movement, concentrating on the lives of members of the Pankhurst family was shown around the world. And in the 21st century the story of the suffragettes was brought to a new generation in the BBC television series Up the Women, the 2015 graphic novel trilogy Suffrajitsu: Mrs. Pankhurst's Amazons and the 2015 film Suffragette.

In recognition of having meetings at the Royal Albert Hall in London, the Suffragettes were inducted into the Hall's Walk of Fame in 2018, making them one of the first eleven recipients of a star on the walk, joining Eric Clapton, Winston Churchill, Muhammad Ali and Albert Einstein, among others who were viewed as "key players" in the building's history.

In February 2019, female Democrat members of the US Congress dressed predominantly in white when attending President Trump's State of the Union address. The choice of one of the colours associated with the suffragettes was to signify the women's solidarity.

The achievement of women's voting rights for elections to the House of Commons did not secure votes for all British women. Despite it being explicitly asserted in the Royal charters of the Virginia Company (in 1607) and its spin-off, the Somers Isles Company (in 1615), that those who chose to settle in England's colonies and their descendants would receive the same enfranchisement as if they had been born in England, the British Government has never created voting districts for the British Parliament in any colony, effectively disenfranchising the women and men of the British Overseas Territories. Local representative governments were created in a number of colonies, starting with Virginia (1619) and Bermuda, or the Somers Isles (1620), but enfranchisement of women for elections to the British Parliament did not necessarily compel the local assemblies to grant women the vote and the struggle would continue.

Notable people

Great Britain

 Margaret Aldersley
 Mary Ann Aldham
 Doreen Allen
 Emily Davison 
 Gertrude Ansell
 Joan Beauchamp
 Edith Marian Begbie
 Rosa May Billinghurst
 Elsie Bowerman
 Janet Boyd
 Lady Constance Bulwer-Lytton
 Evaline Hilda Burkitt
 Mabel Capper
 Georgina Fanny Cheffins
 Ada Nield Chew
 Anne Cobden-Sanderson
 Leonora Cohen
 Rose Cohen
 Jessie Craigen
 Emily Wilding Davison
 Violet Mary Doudney
 Katherine Douglas Smith
 Flora Drummond
 Sophia Duleep Singh
 Norah Elam also known as Norah Dacre Fox
 Edith Margaret Garrud
 Katie Edith Gliddon
 Cicely Hamilton
 Jane Ellen Harrison
 Edith How-Martyn
 Clemence Housman
 Elsie Inglis
 Annie Kenney
 Grace Kimmins
 Lilian Lenton
 Lizzy Lind af Hageby
 Mary Lowndes
 Florence Macfarlane
 Margaret Macfarlane
 Nellie Martel
 Selina Martin
 Emmeline Pankhurst
 Christabel Pankhurst
 Sylvia Pankhurst
 Adela Pankhurst
 Frances Parker
 Emmeline Pethick-Lawrence
 Pleasance Pendred
 Isabella Potbury
 Mary Richardson
 Edith Rigby
 Bertha Ryland
 Myra Sadd Brown
 Genie Sheppard
 Alice Maud Shipley
 Jane Short
 Ethel Smyth
 Ethel Snowden
 Janie Terrero
 Dora Thewlis
 Catherine Tolson
 Helen Tolson
 Florence Tunks
 Leonora Tyson
 Vera Wentworth
 Olive Wharry
 Gertrude Wilkinson
 Laetitia Withall
 Celia Wray

Scotland 
See Template:Women's suffrage in Scotland

Ireland

 Louie Bennett
 Mary Fleetwood Berry
 Helen Chenevix
 Frances Power Cobbe
 Margaret "Gretta" Cousins
 Charlotte Despard
 Norah Elam
 Katharine Gatty 
 Eva Gore-Booth
 Anna Haslam
 Mary Hayden
 Kathleen Lynn
 Constance Markievicz
 Margaret McCoubrey
 Mary Ann McCracken
 Mary MacSwiney
 Helena Molony
 Florence Moon
 Mary Donovan O'Sullivan
 Sarah Persse
 Jenny Wyse Power
 Hanna Sheehy-Skeffington
 Isabella Tod
 Anna Wheeler

Gallery

See also

 Women's suffrage organisations
 Suffragette bombing and arson campaign
 List of women's rights activists
 Pankhurst Centre
 Suffragetto, a board game
 Women's suffrage in the United Kingdom
 Women's suffrage in Scotland
 Women's suffrage in Wales
 Women's suffrage in the United States
 List of suffragette bombings

Notes
 The Oxford English Dictionary has this, "Originally a generic term, suffragist came to refer specifically to those advocates of women's suffrage who campaigned through peaceful, constitutional measures, in distinction to the suffragettes who employed direct action and civil disobedience."

References

Works cited

Further reading

 
 Dangerfield, George. The Strange Death of Liberal England (1935), pp 133–205, 349–73; online free; classic account of how the Liberal Party ruined itself in dealing with the House of Lords, suffragettes, the Irish question, and labour unions, 1906–1914.
  
 
 
 
  
 
 Pankhurst, Sylvia (1911). The suffragette; the history of the women's militant suffrage movement, 1905–1910. New York: Sturgis & Walton Company.
 
 
 Riddell, Fern."Sanitising the Suffragettes: Why is it so easy to forget an unsavoury aspect of Britain's recent past?" History Today (2018) 68#2 pp 8–11.

External links

  The Suffragettes at the Museum of London
  The Suffragettes at Parliament of the United Kingdom
 Collection of Suffrage posters housed at Cambridge University.
 Suffragettes versus Suffragists – website comparing aims and methods of Women's Social and Political Union (Suffragettes) to National Union of Women's Suffrage Societies (Suffragists)
  Women's Social and Political Union (W.S.P.U.). Exploring 20th Century London, Renaissance London. (Archive)
  Women's suffrage. Murphy, Gillian. London School of Economics and Political Science
  Explore the British Library: Suffragette – British Library resource pages about the suffragette movement
  Votes For Women: Explore the campaign for women’s suffrage in the UK at the British Library
 Antiques Journal Information on Suffragette jewellery
 Museum of Australian Democracy: Pank-a-Squith Information on the 1913 board game
 UNCG Special Collections and University Archives selections of American Suffragette manuscripts

1900s neologisms
 
Feminism and history
First-wave feminism
History of women in the United Kingdom
Emmeline Pankhurst
Militant feminism